A donation is a gift given, typically to a cause or/and for charitable purposes.

Donation may also refer to:

Gifts
 Donation (Catholic canon law), the gratuitous transfer in Catholic canon law to another of some right or thing
 Blood donation, when an individual voluntarily has blood drawn to be given to a recipient
 Organ donation, the removal of the tissues of the human body for the purpose of transplanting
 Gamete donation (disambiguation), the donation of gametes, either ova or sperm
 Body donation, the donation of the whole body after death for medical research and education

Places 
 Donation, Pennsylvania, a community in the United States
 Donation Tract, a land tract in southern Ohio

Legal
 Donation Land Claim Act (1850), intended to promote homestead settlements in the Oregon Territory
 Donation of Pepin (756), provided a legal basis for the erection of the Papal States
 Donation of Constantine, a forged Roman imperial edict devised probably between 750 and 775
 Donation of Sutri (728), an agreement reached at Sutri by Liutprand, King of the Lombards and Pope Gregory II
 Bulls of Donation, three papal bulls of Pope Alexander VI

See also
 
 Donatian (disambiguation)
 Donatien, a given name